Rostanga is a genus of sea slugs in the family Discodorididae. Some sources, such as The Sea Slug Forum still classify Rostanga in the family Dorididae.

Phylogeny
A phylogenetic analysis shows that the species Rostanga aureamala, Rostanga elandsia, Rostanga pepha and Rostanga setidens form a sister group with the other species in this genus. The species from Japan and the Marshall Islands form the basal clade. The species from the tropical Indo-Pacific are not monophyletic. The species from the Atlantic Ocean and the Eastern Pacific from a clade that is a sister group to R. australis. The Indo-Pacific species Rostanga bifurcata forms a sister group to Rostanga dentacus.

Species
Species within the genus Rostanga include:

{{linked specieslist
|Rostanga alisae|Martynov, 2003
|Rostanga aliusrubens|Rudman & Avern, 1989
|Rostanga ankyra|Valdés, 2001<ref>Valdés Á. (2001). "Deep-sea cryptobranch dorid nudibranchs (Mollusca, Opisthobranchia) from the tropical West Pacific, with descriptions of two new genera and eighteen new species". [[Malacologia|43(1-2): 237-311. page 294-296.</ref>
|Rostanga anthelia|Perrone, 1991
|Rostanga arbutus|(Angas, 1864)
|Rostanga aureamala|Garovoy, Valdés & Gosliner, 2001
|Rostanga bassia|Rudman & Avern, 1989
|Rostanga bifurcata|Rudman & Avern, 1989
|Rostanga byga|Er. Marcus, 1958
|Rostanga calumus|Rudman & Avern, 1989
|Rostanga crawfordi|(Burn, 1969)
|Rostanga crocea|Edmunds, 2011
|Rostanga dentacus|Rudman & Avern, 1989
|Rostanga elandsia|Garovoy, Valdés & Gosliner, 2001 
|Rostanga ghiselini|Gosliner & Bertsch, 2017
|Rostanga lutescens|(Bergh, 1905)
|Rostanga muscula|(Abraham, 1877)
|Rostanga orientalis|Rudman & Avern, 1989
|Rostanga phepha|Garovoy, Valdés & Gosliner, 2001
|Rostanga pulchra|(MacFarland, 1905)
|Rostanga risbeci|Baba, 1991
|Rostanga rubra|(Risso, 1818)
|Rostanga setidens|(Odhner, 1939)
}}

Species brought into synonymy
 Rostanga australis Rudman & Avern, 1989: synonym of Rostanga crawfordi (Burn, 1969)
 Rostanga evansi Eliot, 1906 : synonym of Jorunna evansi (Eliot, 1906)
 Rostanga hartleyi Burn, 1958 : synonym of Jorunna hartleyi'' (Burn, 1958)

References

Further reading
Bergh, L. S. R.  1881b.  Malacologische Untersuchungen.  In: Reisen im Archipel der Philippinen von Dr. Carl Gottfried Semper.  Zweiter Theil.  Wissenschaftliche Resultate.  Band 2, Theil 4, Heft 2, pp 79–128, pls. G, H, J-L.
Bergh, L. S. R.  1892.  Malacologische Untersuchungen.  In: Reisen im Archipel der Philippinen von Dr. Carl Gottfried Semper.  Zweiter Theil.  Wissenschaftliche Resultate.  Band 2, Theil 3, Heft 18, pp. 995–1165.
Eliot, C. N. E.  1910d.  A monograph of the British nudibranchiate Mollusca: with figures of the species. pt. VIII (supplementary).  Figures by the late Joshua Alder and the late Albany Hancock, and others, pp. 1–198, pls. 1-8.  Ray Society, London.
Fez Sanchez, S. de.  1974.  Ascoglosos y Nudibranquios de España y Portugal.  Consejo Superior de Investigaciones Científicas, Valencia, pp. 1–325, pls. 1-86.
Franc, Andre.  1968.  Sous-classe des opisthobranches, pp. 608–893.  In: E. Fischer, Andre Franc,  Micheline Martoja, G. Termier, & H. Termier.  Traite de zoologie.  Anatomie, systematique, biologie.  Tome V, mollusques gasteropodes et scaphopodes (fascicule III), 1083 pp. 1 pl.
Mcdonald, G. R.  1983.  A review of the nudibranchs of the California coast.  Malacologia 24(1-2):114-276.
Mcdonald, G. R., & J. W. Nybakken.  1980.  Guide to the nudibranchs of California, including most species found from Alaska to Oregon, 72 pp., 112 photos.  American Malacologists.
Muniain, C., & A. Valdés.  2000.  Rostanga byga Er. Marcus, 1958 from Argentina: redescription and comparison to Rostanga pulchra MacFarland, 1905 (Mollusca, Nudibranchia, Doridina).  Proceedings of the California Academy of Sciences 52(1):1-10.
Nordsieck, Fritz.  1972.  Die europäischen Meeresschnecken (Opisthobranchia mit Pyramidellidae; Rissoacea), Vom Eismeer bis Kapverden, Mittelmeer und Schwarzes Meer, xiii + 327.  Gustav Fischer Verlag, Stuttgart.
Odhner, Nils Hjalmar.  1907.  Northern and Arctic invertebrates in the collection of the Swedish State Museum (Riksmuseum).  III. Opisthobranchia and Pteropoda.  Kungl. Svenska Vetenskaps Akademiens Handlingar, Neue Følge 41(4):1-113, pls. 1-3.
Pruvot-Fol, A.  1954b.  Mollusques Opisthobranches.  Faune de France, Paris 58:1-460, pl. 1.
Risbec, J.  1953.  Mollusques nudibranches de la Nouvelle-Calédonie.  Faune de l'Union Française Paris, Libraire Larose 15:1-189.
Schmekel, R. L., & Adolf Portmann.  1982.  Opisthobranchia des Mittelmeeres, Nudibranchia und Saccoglossa.  Fauna e flora del Golfo di Napoli 40, Monografia della Stazione Zoologica di Napoli, pp. i-viii, 1-410, pls. 1-36.  Springer-Verlag.
Thiele, J.  1931.  Handbuch der Systematischen Weichtierkunde.  Band 1, vi + 778 pp.  A. Asher & Co., Amsterdam, reprint 1963.
Thiele, J.  1992.  Handbook of Systematic Malacology, part 2 (Gastropoda: Opisthobranchia and Pulmonata).  Scientific editors of Translation: Rüdiger Bieler & Paula M. Mikkelsen.  xiv + 1189 pp.  Smithsonian Institution Libraries & National Science Foundation, Washington, D. C.
Thompson, T. E.  1975.  Dorid nudibranchs from eastern Australia (Gastropoda, Opisthobranchia).  Journal of Zoology 176(4):477-517, pl. 1.
Thompson, T. E.  1988.  Molluscs: benthic opisthobranchs (Mollusca: Gastropoda) keys and notes for the identification of the species.  Synopses of the British fauna (new series) no. 8, 2nd edition, v + 356 pp. Linnean Society of London & the Estuarine & Brackish-water Sciences Association; E. J. Brill.
Thompson, T. E., & G. H. Brown.  1984.  Biology of opisthobranch molluscs, vol. 2, 229 pp., 41 pls.  Ray Society, no. 156.
Valdés, Á., & T. M. Gosliner.  2001.  Systematics and phylogeny of the caryophyllidia-bearing dorids (Mollusca, Nudibranchia), with descriptions of a new genus and four new species from Indo-Pacific deep waters.  Zoological Journal of the Linnean Society 133(2):103-198.
Vayssière, A. J. B. M.  1901a.  Recherches zoologiques et anatomiques sur les mollusques Opistobranches du Golfe de Marseille (suite et fin).  Memoire No. 1, Annales du Musee d'Histoire Naturelle de Marseille (Zoologie) 6:1-130, pls. 1-7.
Vayssière, A. J. B. M.  1913a.  Mollusques de la France et des régions voisines, tome premier, amphineures, gasteropodes opisthobranches, heteropodes, marseniades et oncidiides.  Encyclopedie Scientifique, publiee sous la direction du Dr. Toulouse, Bibliothèque de Zoologie Doin, Paris, pp. 1–420, I-XII, pls. 1-37.  [Nudibranchia pp. 243–365].

 

Discodorididae
Gastropod genera